UK Uncovered : Full-On is the third season of a United Kingdom reality television show that was filmed on location around the entire country. The show aired for three seasons on the Men and Motors cable/satellite channel in the United Kingdom, operated by Granada, starting in December 2002. The first two seasons were fairly similar to each other, being that they allowed a previously unseen side of British character - often to surprising or shocking levels. The third season showed somewhat of a departure from this style by attempting to introduce more deliberate humor and fictional characters interacting with the public.

External links
 Men & Motors
 Official Website

2002 British television series debuts
2007 British television series endings
British reality television series